Joo Min-kyung is a South Korean actress. She is known for her roles in dramas such as Jirisan, Something in the Rain, Sketch, Soul Mechanic, One Spring Night, Heard It Through the Grapevine and Green Mothers' Club.

Filmography

Television series

Film

References

External links 
 
 

1989 births
Living people
21st-century South Korean actresses
South Korean television actresses
South Korean film actresses